Women & Songs 9 is the ninth album in the Women & Songs franchise.

Overview
The album was released on December 6, 2005.  19 tracks are featured, including one surprise track: Kathleen Edwards' song In State appears on the album among greats like Alanis Morissette, Vanessa Carlton, Faith Hill, and Jann Arden.  Also on the album with her second consecutive appearance is Amanda Stott; her single Paper Rain appeared in 2004, and Homeless Heart from the same album appears on this disc.

Track listing
Cool (Dallas Austin/Gwen Stefani) [3:09]
(performed by Gwen Stefani)
White Houses (Vanessa Carlton/Stephan Jenkins) [3:46]
(performed by Vanessa Carlton)
Ironic - Acoustic Version (Glen Ballard/Alanis Morissette) [3:56]
(performed by Alanis Morissette)
Fireflies (Lori McKenna) [4:27]
(performed by Faith Hill)
I Will Not Be Broken (Gordon Kennedy/Wayne Kirkpatrick/Tommy Sims) [3:40]
(performed by Bonnie Raitt)
Hallelujah - Live Juno Awards Performance (Leonard Cohen) [5:30]
(performed by k.d. lang)
Willing to Fall Down (Russell Broom/Jann Arden Richards) [4:06]
(performed by Jann Arden)
Happy Baby (Damhnait Doyle/Jay Joyce/Tara MacLean/Kim Stockwood) [2:59]
(performed by Shaye)
Pieces of Me (Kara DioGuardi/John Shanks/Ashlee Simpson) [3:38]
(performed by Ashlee Simpson)
Mary - Improbable Pop Radio Mix (Sarah Slean) [3:49]
(performed by Sarah Slean)
In State (Kathleen Edwards) [3:57]
(performed by Kathleen Edwards)
Old Skool Love (M. Brown/James Bryan) [3:26]
(performed by Divine Brown)
The Chokin' Kind (Harlan Howard) [3:36]
(performed by Joss Stone)
Everything to Me (Liz Phair/John Shanks) [3:18]
(performed by Liz Phair)
Homeless Heart (Andreas Carlsson/Desmond Child/Harry "Slick" Sommerdahl) [3:02]
(performed by Amanda Stott)
Black Horse and the Cherry Tree (KT Tunstall) [2:52]
(performed by KT Tunstall)
Open Arms (Ben Barson/Martin Brammer/Colette VanSertima) [4:02]
(performed by Tina Turner)
Inside & Out (Barry Gibb/Maurice Gibb/Robin Gibb) [4:18]
(performed by Feist)
Turned My Back (Theresa Sokyrka) [3:34]
(performed by Theresa Sokyrka)

Production credits
Mastering
Ted Carson

Photography
David Goldman
Jeri Heiden

References
 [ Women & Songs 9 at AllMusic]

2005 compilation albums